Abrams Creek is an  tributary stream of Opequon Creek in Frederick County and the independent city of Winchester in Virginia. Abrams Creek rises north of Round Hill and flows in a southeasterly direction through Winchester. From Winchester, Abrams Creek flows east into Opequon Creek. The stream was originally known as Abraham's Creek.

Variant names
According to the Geographic Names Information System, it has also been known historically as:
Abraham's Creek

Course
Abrams Creek rises approximately one-half mile north-northeast of Round Hill, in Frederick County and then flows generally east to join Opequon Creek approximately one mile east of Winchester.

Watershed
Abrams Creek drains  of area, receives about 38.9 in/year of precipitation, has a wetness index of 443.80, and is about 16% forested.

Tributaries
Tributary streams are listed from the source to the mouth.
Town Run
Ash Hollow Run

See also
List of rivers of Virginia

References

Rivers of Frederick County, Virginia
Rivers of Virginia
Bodies of water of Winchester, Virginia
Tributaries of the Potomac River